The 1937 Michigan State Normal Hurons football team represented Michigan State Normal College (later renamed Eastern Michigan University) during the 1937 college football season. In their 16th season under head coach Elton Rynearson, the Hurons compiled a record of 5–2–1 and outscored their opponents by a combined total of 156 to 69. August R. DeFroscia was the team captain.  The team played its home games at Normal Field on the school's campus in Ypsilanti, Michigan.

In January 1937, Walter Briggs Sr., a native of Ypsilanti, agreed to donate an athletic plant to the school, consisting of a field house and football and baseball grandstands. The football field was called Walter O. Briggs Field in his honor. It opened in March 1938.

Schedule

References

Michigan State Normal
Eastern Michigan Eagles football seasons
Michigan State Normal Hurons football